Thanthonni is a 2010 Indian Malayalam-language action thriller film directed by George Varghese, a former assistant to Joshy. Thanthonni stars Prithviraj Sukumaran, Sheela Kaur, Ambika, Sai Kumar and Suraj Venjaramood.

It was released on 18 March 2010.

Plot
Kochukunju is the spoiled, drunkard son of the Vadakkan Veettil family in Taliparambu, Kannur. He is the son of Katrina, who got pregnant with Kochukunju from a wandering stage artist David out of wedlock (though they later married). David has died and Kochukunju is hated by everyone in his family except his younger uncle, because they want to divide the Vadakkan Veetil property and engage in some business and he is a barrier for them.

It is revealed that Kochukunju knows the whereabouts of both his dad and Neelan, the killer who spared his dad. His dad promises him to return one day.

All of his cousins hate him, except the one who is aware of his honesty. His cousin Nelson engages in a brawl in a hotel fights and the opponent stabs himself to death in order to frame Nelson. He realises that it is Kochukunju's hotel and he is not what he seems to be. Kochukunju had become a powerful businessman and had a lot of property. Kochukunju is about to take blame for his brother as he did in childhood, but is stopped by his friend the Manager Nandan, who takes the blame instead. Kochukunju fights for Nandan in court. His cousin comes home and confesses to KochuKunju’s mother that he is not what he seems to be, and the tears she has shed for many years have not gone to waste as he turns out to be good. He also confesses to the theft he did years back.

His mother and uncle trick him into going to a de-addiction center, where he makes the owner and doctor drink. He says he doesn't need rehabilitation and will stop if his mother tells him so.

In the jail, Nandan is beaten up by three rogues, leading to his hospitalization. He stops Kochukunju from retaliating.

Helen, his fiancee and cousin urges him to tell all, where the flashback of the three rogues is revealed. One day when he met his dad he promises that he won't fail in front his family who hates him. He goes to Dubai and works in a fish market where he met Nandan. They both becomes good friends. One day, Kochukunju saves Hafees Ali Ibrahim who is a do-gooder for the people of Dubai from an accident and becomes his right hand, while his three sons are revealed to be the rogues. Bhai trusts him more than his sons, and he puts his wealth in Kochukunju's name, helped by his lawyer Anand Sharma. The sons kill the father and put the blame on Kochukunju, who is spared after proving his innocence. The sons get jailed. Kochukunju is waiting for the day they come out and he can hand them their property. But when they come out, they kills Anand and both Nandan and Kochukunju decide to kill them. Kochukunju goes to Dubai and kills them after a fight. Kochukunju then returns to Kerala.

His brothers try to kill him by sending out a rogue, who is defeated, and the truth is brought out. They did it for property. He tells them to take whatever they want, and that he does not need a penny, except for his mother and Helen.

The day arrives when the property is divided, and a stranger buys some of their property. The person is a proxy and the real owner then comes out. He introduces himself as David, and everyone is shocked. He tells them he did not come for their money or wealth, the only one with the right to it is Kochukunju. He reveals that Kochukunju is the real owner who bought all the property and is not the loser that they think he is. He had acted in front of them for this long, but became a successful businessman.

He also says that Katrina's brothers sent out a man to kill him. Her brothers ask for forgiveness.

He comes to their room where his photo is displayed with a lit candle. Kochukunju is happy as his father is back now and, with his mother's permission, blows out the candle that was kept burning in remembrance of David. His mother gives him a light slap for hiding the truth for so long and the family—Kochukunju, his parents and Helen is united.

Cast

Prithviraj Sukumaran as Vadakkan Veettil Kochukunju/ Bhai
Sheela as Helen Varghese, one of the Vadakkan Veetil granddaughters from her mother’s side
Suraj Venjaramood as Achu
Ambika as Vadakkan Veettil Katrina, Kochukunju's mother, wife of David and youngest daughter of Vadakkan Veetil Kochouseppu
Sai Kumar as David, Katrina's husband and  Kochukunju's father 
Captain Raju as Vadakkan Veettil Kuriachen
Vijayaraghavan as Vadakkanveettil Kochouseppu and Vadakkan Veettil Thankachen (Double Role)
Suresh Krishna as Adv. Nelson, Kochukunju's cousin
Ramu as Vadakkan Veettil Thomachen
 Jagannatha Varma as Fr. Stephen Chandy
Jagathy Sreekumar as Dr. Thomas Vaidyan
Baburaj as  Appakkattil Ummachan
Saju Attingal as Appakkattil Pappachan
P. Vasu as Adv. Anand Sharma
Sadiq as S.P Alex Thomas Vadakkan Veettil, Kochukunju’s cousin
Ranjith as Neelakandan
Sudheesh as Nandan
Lakshmi Priya as Alice
Mahadevan as Hafees Ali Ibrahim
Meghanathan as Sub Inspector R. Ganeshan
Anil Murali as Transport Minister V. V. Joseph Kurian, Kochukunju’s cousin
Kulappulli Leela as Achu's mother
Bindu Panicker
Kalabhavan Abi as Ameer, Hafees Ali Ibrahim's son
Adithya Menon as Anwar Ali
Shivaji Guruvayoor as Advocate Charlie
Abu Salim as Vincent
Shane Nigam as Young Kochukunju
Kanya Bharathi
Jolly Isho

Music 

Music was composed by Thej Mervin, with lyrics written by Gireesh Puthenchery and T. A. Shahid.

Production
Shooting for the film started on 6 November 2009. The main locations were Kochi, Ottapalam, Pollachi and Dubai. The film wrapped up shooting by mid-January, 2010 and started post production.

Release
The film was released on 18 March 2010.

Reception
The New Indian Express wrote that
"The film could have been much watchable had it not been for the shoddy overplay and second-rate execution" 
Sify.com wrote that "It has been made as per certain age old formulas which could have been fine some two decades back. If you are the kind who regards a mixture of buffoonery, fights and some heroism as the perfect recipe for entertainment, this one could turn out to be a not-so-bad effort. For the rest of the world, watch it at your own risk". Paresh C Palicha from Rediff wrote that "Thanthonni may have been an ambitious project for Prithviraj and the debutant director George Varghese. But the oft- repeated storyline and lack of novelty in presentation gives the film a jaded look"

References

External links

2010 films
Films shot in Kochi
Films shot in Ottapalam
Films shot in Pollachi
Films shot in Kannur
Films shot in Dubai
2010s Malayalam-language films